Benešov u Semil is a municipality and village in Semily District in the Liberec Region of the Czech Republic. It has about 900 inhabitants.

References

External links

Villages in Semily District